The New England Wilderness Act of 2006 was signed into law by President George W. Bush on December 1, 2006. The Act designated three (3) new wilderness areas in the U.S. states of New Hampshire and Vermont, while expanding five (5) existing wilderness areas across these two states. The Act also created a new recreation area in Vermont.

In addition to the new wilderness areas listed above, the Act expanded the existing wilderness areas list below:

In addition to the wilderness areas listed above, the Act created the Moosalamoo National Recreation Area in the Green Mountain National Forest.

See also

 List of U.S. Wilderness Areas
 Wilderness Act

References

United States federal public land legislation
Environmental law in the United States